Di or DI may refer to:

Arts and media

Music
 Di, a tone in the solfège ascending chromatic scale existing between Do and Re
 dizi (instrument) or di, a Chinese transverse flute
 D.I. (band), a punk band from Southern California
 D.I. (EP), a 1983 EP by the same band above

Other media
 The D.I., 1957 military film by Jack Webb
 Dagens Industri, a Swedish financial newspaper
 DI.FM, an internet radio service

Businesses and organisations
 Defence Intelligence, a UK military intelligence agency
 Defensa Interior, an anti-Franco militant anarchist group in 1960s Spain
 Deseret Industries, an LDS thrift store
 Desert Inn, a former casino in Las Vegas
 Direction Italy, a liberal-conservative political party in Italy
 Dirgantara Indonesia, an Indonesian aircraft company
 Discovery Institute, an intelligent design advocacy group
 Norwegian Air UK, a UK based airline (IATA designator)
 DynCorp International, a major United States defense contractor
 Myanmar Directorate of Defence Industries

Education 
 Diplomi-insinööri, a Finnish 6-year engineering degree
 Direct instruction, an instructional method focused on a systematic curriculum design

Natural sciences
 Di, a prefix used in organic chemistry nomenclature
 Didymium, a mixture of the elements praseodymium and neodymium once thought to be an element
 Diopside, a clinopyroxene mineral
 Band 3, a protein
 Deionized water, a type of water deprived of the dissolved impurities of ionic nature
 Diabetes insipidus, a disease
 Iodothyronine deiodinase type I, one of a subfamily of enzymes important in the activation and deactivation of thyroid hormones
Dentinogenesis imperfecta a genetic disorder of tooth development

People

Ethnic groups 
 Di (Five Barbarians), an ethnic group that overran northern China during the Sixteen Kingdoms period
 Beidi or Northern Di, ethnic groups living in northern China during the Zhou Dynasty

Individuals
 Di (surname) (狄), a Chinese surname sometimes also romanized Dee, particularly:
 Di Renjie a Tang-dynasty official later fictionalized in a series of Chinese detective stories
 A diminutive form of the names:
 Diana (given name)
 Diane (disambiguation)
 Dianne (disambiguation)
 Diana, Princess of Wales (1961–1997), commonly known as Princess Di or Lady Di

Technology
 Digital intermediate, a filmmaking post-production process
 Dependency injection, a method of decoupling components in software
 DI unit or Direct Input box, an audio device used with PA systems and in sound recording studios
 DI register, or destination index, in x86 computer architecture  
 Direction indicator, an instrument in aviation also known as a heading indicator
 Direct ignition, see Distributor § Direct ignition
 Direct injection, a type of fuel injection

Religion
 di, a Chinese word employed in
 the temple names of deified Chinese emperors
 Shangdi (Chinese: , lit. "Lord on High"), the Chinese name for the supreme sky god either in native Chinese beliefs or in translation of monotheistic faiths like Christianity and Islam
 di (Chinese concept), the concept of "earth" in traditional Chinese cosmologies
 di, an irregular Latin masculine plural of deus ("god", "deity")

Other uses
 Detective Inspector, a rank in certain police forces
 Di (cuneiform), an ancient written sign
 Diameter, the distance across the middle of a circle
 Di Department, one of the eight departments of the Sourou Province in Burkina Faso
 501 (number) in Roman numerals
 Disability insurance, a form of insurance that insures the beneficiary's earned income against the risk that a disability will make working uncomfortable
 Hong Kong Document of Identity, issued by the Hong Kong Immigration Department
 Drill instructor, a non-commissioned officer in many military or police forces

See also 
 Lady Di (disambiguation)
 Die (disambiguation)